The 2011 WNBA season is the 14th season for the Tulsa Shock franchise of the Women's National Basketball Association. It is their 2nd in Tulsa. The Shock finished the season with a league record for lowest winning percentage (.088).

Transactions

WNBA Draft
The following are the Shock's selections in the 2011 WNBA Draft.

Transaction log
February 1: The Shock traded a second-round pick in the 2012 Draft to the Los Angeles Sparks in exchange for Andrea Riley.
February 16: The Shock re-signed Marion Jones.
February 25: The Shock signed Juanita Ward.
March 28: The Shock signed Sheryl Swoopes.
April 8: The Shock signed Miranda Ayim to a training camp contract.
April 30: The Shock signed Darxia Morris to a training camp contract.
May 2: The Shock traded Scholanda Robinson to the San Antonio Silver Stars in exchange for second- and third-round picks in the 2012 Draft.
May 3: The Shock signed Betty Lennox.
May 12: The Shock announced Nicole Ohlde's retirement.
May 25: The Shock waived Italee Lucas and Juanita Ward.
June 1: The Shock waived Betty Lennox, Darxia Morris and Rashanda McCants.
June 15: The Shock waived Miranda Ayim.
June 16: The Shock signed Jacinta Monroe.
June 28: The Shock waived Jacinta Monroe.
July 4: The Shock signed Doneeka Lewis.
July 9: The Shock announced that Nolan Richardson resigned from head coach and general manager duties. Assistant coach Teresa Edwards was named interim head coach.
July 15: The Shock signed Betty Lennox and waived Chastity Reed.
July 21: The Shock signed Abi Olajuwon and waived Marion Jones.
July 22: The Shock signed Karima Christmas and waived Doneeka Lewis.

Trades

Personnel changes

Additions

Subtractions

Roster

Depth

Season standings

Schedule

Preseason

|- align="center" bgcolor="ffbbbb"
| 1 || May 29 || 5:00pm || @ Seattle || 70-76 || Holt (25) || Cambage, Jackson (8) || 4 players (2) || KeyArena  4,979 || 0-1
|-

Regular season

|- align="center" bgcolor="ffbbbb"
| 1 || June 4 || 8:00pm || @ San Antonio || COX || 73-93 || Cambage (18) || Cambage (10) || Jackson (4) || AT&T Center  12,406 || 0-1
|- align="center" bgcolor="ffbbbb"
| 2 || June 7 || 8:00pm || @ Minnesota ||  || 65-75 || Cambage (16) || Cambage (15) || Jackson (3) || Target Center  7,713 || 0-2
|- align="center" bgcolor="ffbbbb"
| 3 || June 10 || 8:00pm || San Antonio ||  || 62-93 || CambagePedersen (12) || Pedersen (7) || Swoopes (4) || BOK Center  7,509 || 0-3
|- align="center" bgcolor="ffbbbb"
| 4 || June 12 || 3:00pm || @ Connecticut ||  || 79-90 || Latta (26) || Pedersen (8) || Pedersen (5) || Mohegan Sun Arena  6,520 || 0-4
|- align="center" bgcolor="ffbbbb"
| 5 || June 14 || 7:00pm || @ Indiana || ESPN2 || 74-82 || Latta (19) || Jackson (11) || Latta (5) || Conseco Fieldhouse  6,024 || 0-5
|- align="center" bgcolor="bbffbb"
| 6 || June 18 || 8:00pm || Washington ||  || 77-59 || Latta (22) || Jackson (9) || Pedersen (7) || BOK Center  4,423 || 1-5
|- align="center" bgcolor="ffbbbb"
| 7 || June 21 || 8:00pm || Seattle ||  || 77-82 || Jackson (20) || Jackson (10) || Pedersen (4) || BOK Center  4,612 || 1-6
|- align="center" bgcolor="ffbbbb"
| 8 || June 23 || 12:30pm || New York ||  || 82-94 || Cambage (22) || Jackson (6) || Latta (7) || BOK Center  4,682 || 1-7
|- align="center" bgcolor="ffbbbb"
| 9 || June 26 || 4:00pm || @ Washington || CSN-MA || 63-83 || Cambage (15) || Cambage (7) || Latta (5) || Verizon Center  10,675 || 1-8
|- align="center" bgcolor="ffbbbb"
| 10 || June 30 || 8:00pm || Minnesota ||  || 71-101 || Latta (13) || Lacy (7) || Pedersen (5) || BOK Center  3,970 || 1-9
|-

|- align="center" bgcolor="ffbbbb"
| 11 || July 8 || 8:00pm || Phoenix ||  || 78-86 || Cambage (19) || Pedersen (9) || Lewis (9) || BOK Center  4,081 || 1-10
|- align="center" bgcolor="ffbbbb"
| 12 || July 10 || 6:00pm || @ Phoenix || NBATVCOX || 63-102 || Jackson (9) || Pedersen (7) || Riley (5) || US Airways Center  7,696 || 1-11
|- align="center" bgcolor="ffbbbb"
| 13 || July 13 || 12:30pm || @ Chicago ||  || 54-72 || Lacy (13) || Jackson (11) || Jackson (5) || Allstate Arena  13,838 || 1-12
|- align="center" bgcolor="ffbbbb"
| 14 || July 15 || 8:00pm || Los Angeles ||  || 74-79 || Riley (15) || Jackson (10) || Holt (5) || BOK Center  5,034 || 1-13
|- align="center" bgcolor="ffbbbb"
| 15 || July 17 || 4:00pm || @ New York || NBATVMSG+ || 57-88 || Jackson (17) || Jackson (11) || Holt (4) || Prudential Center  6,735 || 1-14
|-
| colspan="11" align="center" valign="middle" | All-Star break
|- align="center" bgcolor="ffbbbb"
| 16 || July 26 || 8:00pm || Atlanta ||  || 68-76 || Cambage (16) || Jackson (17) || JacksonLattaSwoopes (3) || BOK Center  3,435 || 1-15
|- align="center" bgcolor="ffbbbb"
| 17 || July 28 || 8:00pm || Chicago ||  || 55-64 || Latta (20) || Jackson (15) || Holt (5) || BOK Center  4,012 || 1-16
|- align="center" bgcolor="ffbbbb"
| 18 || July 30 || 8:00pm || Seattle ||  || 72-89 || Jackson (16) || Swoopes (8) || Lacy (5) || BOK Center  5,067 || 1-17
|-

|- align="center" bgcolor="ffbbbb"
| 19 || August 5 || 8:00pm || Indiana ||  || 65-85 || JacksonLacy (12) || Jackson (8) || Jackson (3) || BOK Center  5,013 || 1-18
|- align="center" bgcolor="ffbbbb"
| 20 || August 6 || 8:00pm || @ San Antonio ||  || 64-72 || Jackson (27) || Jackson (10) || CambageRiley (3) || AT&T Center  8,273 || 1-19
|- align="center" bgcolor="ffbbbb"
| 21 || August 9 || 10:30pm || @ Los Angeles || PRIME || 66-71 || Jackson (18) || Holt (6) || Swoopes (4) || Staples Center  8,255 || 1-20
|- align="center" bgcolor="ffbbbb"
| 22 || August 11 || 10:00pm || @ Seattle ||  || 63-77 || Cambage (24) || Cambage (10) || Swoopes (3) || KeyArena  6,503 || 1-21
|- align="center" bgcolor="ffbbbb"
| 23 || August 14 || 7:00pm || @ Minnesota || NBATVCOXFS-N || 54-82 || Swoopes (9) || Cambage (5) || Swoopes (3) || Target Center  8,388 || 1-22
|- align="center" bgcolor="ffbbbb"
| 24 || August 21 || 7:00pm || Los Angeles ||  || 67-73 || Swoopes (17) || Jackson (11) || Latta (6) || BOK Center  6,012 || 1-23
|- align="center" bgcolor="ffbbbb"
| 25 || August 23 || 8:00pm || Minnesota ||  || 72-78 || Holt (18) || Jackson (10) || Latta (7) || BOK Center  3,750 || 1-24
|- align="center" bgcolor="ffbbbb"
| 26 || August 25 || 10:00pm || @ Seattle ||  || 57-74 || JacksonSwoopes (12) || Jackson (9) || LattaRiley (3) || KeyArena  6,887 || 1-25
|- align="center" bgcolor="bbffbb"
| 27 || August 26 || 10:30pm || @ Los Angeles || NBATV || 77-75 || Jackson (20) || Jackson (11) || Holt (7) || Staples Center  8,997 || 2-25
|- align="center" bgcolor="bbffbb"
| 28 || August 28 || 4:00pm || Connecticut ||  || 83-72 || Swoopes (22) || Jackson (12) || Latta (6) || BOK Center  4,813 || 3-25
|- align="center" bgcolor="ffbbbb"
| 29 || August 30 || 8:00pm || Phoenix ||  || 74-96 || Cambage (16) || Pedersen (7) || Latta (6) || BOK Center  3,590 || 3-26
|-

|- align="center" bgcolor="ffbbbb"
| 30 || September 2 || 8:00pm || Seattle ||  || 72-78 || Lacy (18) || Jackson (10) || Swoopes (6) || BOK Center  6,117 || 3-27
|- align="center" bgcolor="ffbbbb"
| 31 || September 4 || 3:00pm || @ Atlanta || SSO || 52-73 || Jackson (15) || Jackson (11) || Swoopes (4) || Allstate Arena  7,661 || 3-28
|- align="center" bgcolor="ffbbbb"
| 32 || September 8 || 10:00pm || @ Phoenix || NBATVCOX || 76-91 || Cambage (22) || Jackson (10) || Riley (5) || US Airways Center  8,189 || 3-29
|- align="center" bgcolor="ffbbbb"
| 33 || September 9 || 10:30pm || @ Los Angeles || NBATV || 73-84 || CambageRiley (18) || Jackson (9) || Holt (5) || Staples Center  10,299 || 3-30
|- align="center" bgcolor="ffbbbb"
| 34 || September 11 || 7:00pm || San Antonio || NBATVFS-SW || 94-102 (OT) || RileySwoopes (20) || Jackson (9) || Holt (7) || BOK Center  5,949 || 3-31
|-

| All games are viewable on WNBA LiveAccess or ESPN3.com

Statistics

Regular season

Awards and honors
Liz Cambage was named to the 2011 WNBA All-Star Team as a reserve.
Liz Cambage was named to the All-Rookie Team.

References

External links

Tulsa Shock seasons
Tulsa Shock
2011 in sports in Oklahoma